The Unemployment Insurance Act 1927 (17 & 18 Geo. V c 30) was an Act of the Parliament of the United Kingdom passed by the Conservative Party in 1927. It reintroduced means testing for some benefits. One of the most controversial proposals was to raise Treasury contributions to that made by employers and workers, but that was dropped from the final legislation.

References

Insurance legislation
United Kingdom Acts of Parliament 1927
1927 in economics
Unemployment in the United Kingdom